Cemento-osseous dysplasia (COD) is a benign condition of the jaws that may arise from the fibroblasts of the periodontal ligaments.  It is most common in African-American females.  The three types are periapical cemental dysplasia (common in those of African descent), focal cemento-osseous dysplasia (Caucasians), and florid cemento-osseous dysplasia (African descent). Periapical occurs most commonly in the mandibular anterior teeth while focal appears predominantly in the mandibular posterior teeth and florid in both maxilla and mandible in multiple quadrants.


Diagnosis
Diagnosis is important so that the treating doctor does not confuse it for another periapical disease such as rarefying osteitis or condensing osteitis. Incorrect diagnosis could lead to unnecessary root canal treatments.  It can be diagnosed by radiographic appearance. Confirming the tooth is vital, as is noting the demographic (African American females).

Treatment
There is no treatment necessary for any type of COD.

References

Kahn, Michael A. Basic Oral and Maxillofacial Pathology. Volume 1. 2001.
Neville and Damm. Oral and Maxillofacial Pathology, 3rd Edition. 2012.

Pathology of the maxilla and mandible